Keuka Inlet is a river located in Steuben County, New York. It flows into Keuka Lake by Hammondsport, New York.

References

Rivers of Steuben County, New York
Rivers of New York (state)